The 2017–18 FA Cup (also known as the FA Challenge Cup) was the 137th edition of the oldest recognised football tournament in the world. It was sponsored by Emirates, and known as The Emirates FA Cup for sponsorship purposes. 737 clubs were accepted into the tournament. It began with the Extra Preliminary Round on 5 August 2017, and concluded with the final on 19 May 2018. The winners qualified for the 2018–19 UEFA Europa League group stage.

The third round match between Brighton & Hove Albion and Crystal Palace on 8 January 2018 was the first competitive game in England where video assistant referee (VAR) technology was available, although it was not used.

Kelechi Iheanacho of Leicester City became the first player to score a goal awarded by a video assistant referee (VAR) in competitive English football as Leicester beat Fleetwood Town 2–0 in the FA Cup third-round replay on 16 January 2018. Referee Jon Moss initially disallowed the goal for offside but he consulted with video official Mike Jones, who told him Nathan Pond's trailing foot was keeping Iheanacho onside. The goal was awarded 67 seconds after it hit the back of the net.

Craig Pawson became the first referee in English football to watch a video recording at the sideline in the fourth round tie between Liverpool and West Bromwich Albion on 27 January 2018. He awarded a penalty to Liverpool.

Premier League side Arsenal were the defending champions, but they were eliminated by Nottingham Forest in the third round on 7 January 2018.

Calendar and prizes

Qualifying rounds

All of the competing teams that are not members of either the Premier League or English Football League had to compete in the qualifying rounds to secure one of 32 available places in the First Round Proper. The qualifying competition began with the Extra Preliminary Round on 5 August 2017. The final (fourth) qualifying round was played over the weekend of 14 October 2017.

First Round Proper
The First Round draw took place on 16 October and was broadcast live on BBC Two and BT Sport. All 40 First Round Proper ties were played on the weekend of 4 November. 32 teams from the qualifying competition joined the 48 teams from League One and League Two to compete in this round. The round included two teams from Level 8, Heybridge Swifts and Hyde United, who were the lowest-ranked teams still in the competition.

Second Round Proper
The Second Round draw took place on 6 November and was broadcast live on BBC Two and BT Sport. All 20 Second Round Proper ties were played on the weekend of 2 December. This round included three teams from Level 7 – Hereford, Slough Town, and Leatherhead – who were the lowest-ranked teams still in the competition.

Third Round Proper
The Third Round draw took place on 4 December 2017 and was broadcast live on BBC Two and BT Sport before the final second round tie between Slough Town and Rochdale. All 32 Third Round Proper ties took place on the weekend of 5–8 January 2018. A total of 64 clubs played in the third round; 20 winners of the second round, and 44 teams from Premier League and EFL Championship entering in this round. For the first time in 67 years no non-league team (i.e. from Level 5 or below) made the Third Round Proper, with all 32 such teams that advanced through qualifying being knocked out in the first two rounds, the last 10 in the Second Round Proper.

Fourth Round Proper
The draw for the Fourth Round Proper took place on 8 January 2018 at 19:10 GMT and was broadcast live on BBC Two and BT Sport. This round included four teams from Level 4 – Yeovil Town, Notts County, Coventry City, and Newport County – who were the lowest-ranked teams still in the competition.

Fifth Round Proper
 
The draw for the Fifth Round Proper took place on 29 January 2018 at 19:20 GMT and was broadcast live on BBC One. This round included one team from Level 4 still in the competition, Coventry City, who were the lowest-ranked team in this round.

Quarter-finals
The draw for the quarter-finals took place on 17 February 2018 at 20:00 GMT and was broadcast live on BT Sport, the BBC Sport website and app, and BBC Radio 5 Live. This round included one team from Level 3 still in the competition, Wigan Athletic, who were the lowest-ranked team in this round.

There were no replays in the FA Cup quarter-finals, following a rule change introduced for the previous tournament. If a match was level after 90 minutes, 30 minutes of extra time were played. If the score had still been level, the tie would have been decided by a penalty shoot-out.

Semi-finals
 
The draw for the semi-finals took place on 18 March 2018, after the conclusion of the quarter-final match between Leicester City and Chelsea. The draw was conducted by Gianfranco Zola and Petr Čech. The semi-finals were played on Saturday 21 April and Sunday 22 April 2018 at Wembley Stadium.

Final

Bracket
The following is the bracket which the FA Cup resembled. Numbers in parentheses next to the match score represent the results of a replay, except for the quarter-finals stage onwards. Numbers in parentheses next to the replay score represents the results of a penalty shoot-out except for the quarter-finals stage onwards.

Top goalscorers

Television rights
The following matches were broadcast live on UK television:

References

External links
 The official FA Cup website

 
FA Cup seasons
FA Cup
FA Cup